Lordswood Boys' School (formerly Lordswood Technical School) is a secondary school for boys located in the Harborne area of Birmingham, in the West Midlands of England.

Opened in September 1957, ten years later it had changed to a grammar school and subsequent years later to a comprehensive school. Every ten years the school has an anniversary party from the year it was built.

Previously a community school administered by Birmingham City Council, Lordswood Boys' School converted to academy status in January 2013 and joined Lordswood Girls' School as part of Lordswood Academies Trust. In July 2017 Lordswood Boys' School left Lordswood Academies Trust after an extended period in Special Measures entered into after being rated Inadequate in multiple Ofsted inspections.  and undergoing a severe drop in the number of students enrolled. Of a school capacity of 733, only 356 were enrolled as of 2 December 2016.

Central Academies Trust took on running of the school as of 1 September 2017. With the building outdated, the school was then rebuilt and the original building was demolished.

Notable former pupils

Lordswood Technical Grammar School
Roger Tonge, actor.

Lordswood Boys' School
Mike Gayle, author
Rico Henry, footballer

References

External links
Lordswood Boys' School official website

Boys' schools in the West Midlands (county)
Secondary schools in Birmingham, West Midlands
Academies in Birmingham, West Midlands
Harborne